FL1, FL-1, or similar may refer to:
 FL1 (Lazio regional railways)
 Florida's 1st congressional district, a congressional district in the U.S. state of Florida
 Florida State Road A1A, formerly Florida State Road 1
 Football League One, the second-highest division of The Football League and third-highest division overall in the English football league system
 a technical standard for the rating of flashlights
 a model of the Chinese Silkworm (missile)
 a taxicab, one of the List of Austin motor vehicles